The 1997 Kamchatka earthquake, or 1997 Kronotsky earthquake, occurred on December 5 at 11:26 UTC near the east coast of the Kamchatka Peninsula. It was an  7.7 (7.6–7.8) earthquake and was felt with intensity MM V in Petropavlovsk-Kamchatskiy. A 60 cm (23.6 in) tsunami was recorded in Kahului, 47 cm (18.5 in.) in Hilo, and 15 cm (6 in.) in Unalaska. The local tsunami generated by this earthquake affected a mostly unpopulated region. A post-tsunami survey found runup (height above normal sea level) on the Kronotsky Peninsula was no more than a few meters. However, a later geological survey north of the peninsula, as well as an interview with a park ranger, indicate that runup was up to  along the coast near the Little and Big Chazhma rivers and north to the Storozh River.

Deformation during and after this earthquake was measured by GPS. There were significant foreshocks, and also an apparently independent rupture along the southern border of the primary rupture.

References

External links

Kamchatka
Kamchatka Earthquake, 1997
1997 tsunamis
December 1997 events in Russia
Tsunami earthquakes
Earthquakes in the Russian Far East